Catocala stamensis is a moth in the family Erebidae. It is found in Thailand.

References

stamensis
Moths described in 2002
Moths of Asia